Split log may refer to:

Wood splitting
Billet (wood), a first step in green woodworking manufacture
Shake (shingle)
Puncheon log, a slab of timber with one face smoothed, used for flooring or construction, as described at Copus massacre

Tools
Log (disambiguation)
Log splitter
Splitting maul